Real or perceived ideological bias on the free online encyclopedia Wikipedia, especially on its English-language edition, has been a frequent subject of academic analysis and public criticism of the project. Questions relate to whether its content is biased due to the political, religious, or other ideology of its volunteer editors, and the effects this may have on the encyclopedia's reliability.

Wikipedia has an internal policy which states that articles must be written from a neutral point of view, which means representing fairly, proportionately, and, as far as possible, without editorial bias, all of the significant points of view that have been verifiably published by reliable sources on a topic. Collectively, findings show that Wikipedia articles edited by large numbers of editors with opposing ideological views are at least as neutral as other similar sources, but articles with smaller edit volumes by fewer—or more ideologically homogeneous—contributors are more likely to reflect an editorial bias.

Analyses

Bias in content in relation to U.S. politics 
Shane Greenstein and Feng Zhu of the Harvard Business School have authored several studies examining Wikipedia articles related to U.S. politics and the editors that work on them to identify aspects of ideological bias within its collective intelligence.

In Is Wikipedia Biased? (2012), the authors examined a sample of 28,382 articles related to U.S. politics as of January 2011, measuring their degree of bias on a "slant index" based on a method developed by Matthew Gentzkow and Jesse Shapiro in 2010, to measure bias in newspaper media. This slant index purports to measure an ideological lean toward either Democratic or Republican based on key phrases within the text such as "war in Iraq", "civil rights", "trade deficit", "economic growth", "illegal immigration" and "border security". Each phrase is assigned a slant index based on how often it is used by Democratic vs. Republican members of U.S. Congress and this lean rating is assigned to a Wikipedia contribution that includes the same key phrase. The authors concluded that older articles from the early years of Wikipedia leaned Democratic, whereas those created more recently held more balance. They suggest that articles did not change their bias significantly due to revision, but rather that over time newer articles containing opposite points of view were responsible for centering the average overall.

In a more extensive American follow-up to the 2012 study, Do Experts or Collective Intelligence Write with More Bias? Evidence from Encyclopedia Britannica and Wikipedia (2018), Greenstein and Zhu directly compare about 4,000 articles related to U.S. politics between Wikipedia (written by an online community) and the matching articles from Encyclopædia Britannica (written by experts) using similar methods as their 2010 study to measure "slant" (Democratic vs. Republican) and to quantify the degree of "bias". The authors found that "Wikipedia articles are more slanted towards Democratic views than are Britannica articles, as well as more biased", particularly those focusing on civil rights, corporations, and government. Entries about immigration trended toward Republican. They further found that "[t]he difference in bias between a pair of articles decreases with more revisions" and, when articles were substantially revised, the difference in bias compared to Britannica was statistically negligible. The implication, per the authors, is that "many contributions are needed to reduce considerable bias and slant to something close to neutral".

Collaboration on contested or slanted content 

Research shows that Wikipedia is prone to Neutral Point of View violations caused by bias from its editors, including systemic bias.

The study Ideological Segregation among Online Collaborators: Evidence from Wikipedians (2016) by Greenstein, Zhu, and Yuan Gu was a working paper that was not peer-reviewed. It focused on the behaviors of contributing editors themselves. Working again within a subset of articles related to U.S. politics and using terminology introduced in Is Wikipedia Biased?, the authors offer several significant findings. They found that editors are slightly more likely to contribute to articles which exhibit an opposite slant to their own—a tendency that the authors called opposites attract. They further found that debates on Wikipedia tend to exhibit a "prevalence of unsegregated conversations over time", meaning that the debates on Wikipedia tend to involve editors of differing view—which the authors called unsegregated—as opposed to debates involving only editors with homogeneous views (segregated).  The unsegregated conversation is supposed to favor the convergence towards a neutral point of view. They also found that the degree of an editor bias decreases over time and experience, and decreases faster for editors involved in editing very slanted material: "[t]he largest declines are found among contributors who edit or add content to articles that have more biases". They also estimated that, on average, it takes about one year longer for Republican material to reach a neutral viewpoint than for Democratic material.

A subsequent peer-reviewed study found that a model of this productive friction, which is defined as the collective resolution of socio-cognitive conflicts, can explain and predict the dynamics of knowledge production on Wikipedia, further supporting the hypothesis that collaborative work from multiple editors with opposing views help reach neutrality. Furthermore, another study found on the French Wikipedia that a majority of editors had a propensity to share equally in a dictator game, and that this propensity was correlated with their involvement on Wikipedia (as measured by the time spent and attachment).

Claims of bias 
According to Bloomberg News in 2016, "The encyclopedia's reliance on outside sources, primarily newspapers, means it will be only as diverse as the rest of the media—which is to say, not very." According to Haaretz in 2018, "Wikipedia has succeeded in being accused of being both too liberal and too conservative, and has critics from across the spectrum", while also noting that Wikipedia is "usually accused of being too liberal".

According to CNN in 2022, Wikipedia's ideological bias "may match the ideological bias of the news ecosystem." According to The Boston Globe in 2022, "A Wikipedia editor's interest in an article sprouts from their values and opinions, and their contributions are filtered through their general interpretation of reality. Edict or no, a neutral point of view is impossible. Not even a Wikipedia editor can transcend that." According to Slate in 2022, "Right-wing commentators have grumbled about [Wikipedia]'s purported left-wing bias for years, but they have been unable to offer a viable alternative encyclopedia option: A conservative version of Wikipedia, Conservapedia, has long floundered with minimal readership." while also noting that conservatives "have not generally attacked Wikipedia as extensively" as other media sources.

Liberal and left-wing bias

Larry Sanger 
Wikipedia co-founder Larry Sanger has been critical of Wikipedia ever since he was laid off as the only editorial employee of Wikipedia in its early stages and left the project in 2002. He went on to found and work for competitors to Wikipedia, including Citizendium and Everipedia. Among other criticisms, Sanger has been vocal in his view that Wikipedia's articles present a left-wing and liberal or "establishment point of view". Sanger has cited a number of examples for what he views as left-wing and liberal bias, such as that "Drug legalisation, dubbed drug liberalisation by Wikipedia, has only a little information about any potential hazards of drug legalisation policies" and that the Wikipedia article on Joe Biden does not sufficiently reflect "the concerns that Republicans have had about him" or the Ukraine allegations. Because of these perceived biases, Sanger views Wikipedia as untrustworthy. He has also accused Wikipedia of abandoning its neutrality policy (neutral point of view).

Conservapedia 
American Christian conservative activist Andrew Schlafly founded the online encyclopedia Conservapedia in 2006 based on his view of "liberal bias" on Wikipedia. Conservapedia's editors have compiled a list of alleged examples of liberal bias on Wikipedia, including assertions it is "anti-American", "anti-Christian" and "anti-capitalism".

Infogalactic 
American far-right activist Vox Day founded the online encyclopedia Infogalactic in 2017 to counter what he views as "the left-wing thought police who administer [Wikipedia]".

Croatian Wikipedia and right-wing bias 

In 2013, Jutarnji list reported that the administrators and editors of the Croatian-language version of Wikipedia were projecting a right-wing bias into topics such as the Ustasha regime, anti-fascism, Serbs, the LGBT community, and gay marriage. Many of the critics were former editors of the website who said they had been exiled for expressing concern. The small size of the Croatian Wikipedia (as of September 2013, it had 466 active editors of whom 27 were administrators) was cited as a major factor. Two days after the story broke, Croatian Minister of Science, Education and Sports Željko Jovanović advised students not to use the website. In 2018, historians with the University of Zagreb told the Balkan Investigative Reporting Network (BIRN) that the Croatian Wikipedia has "many shortcomings, factual mistakes and ideologically loaded language" and that students are often referred to the English Wikipedia instead of their native Croatian, especially for topics on Croatian history.

Responses from Wikipedia 
In 2006, Wikipedia co-founder Jimmy Wales said, "The Wikipedia community is very diverse, from liberal to conservative to libertarian and beyond. If averages mattered, and due to the nature of the wiki software (no voting) they almost certainly don't, I would say that the Wikipedia community is slightly more liberal than the U.S. population on average, because we are global and the international community of English speakers is slightly more liberal than the U.S. population. There are no data or surveys to back that." In 2007, Wales said that claims of liberal bias on Wikipedia "are not supported by the facts".

In 2021, Wikipedia denied accusations made by Larry Sanger of having a particular political bias, with a spokesperson for the encyclopedia saying that third-party studies have shown that its editors come from a variety of ideological viewpoints and that "As more people engage in the editing process on Wikipedia, the more neutral articles tend to become".

Controversies

Japanese Wikipedia 
In a March 2021 article, Yumiko Sato from Slate criticized the Japanese-language version of Wikipedia for spreading historical revisionist misinformation about the Nanjing Massacre, comfort women and Unit 731.

Spanish Wikipedia
In 2022, several Spanish cultural and political figures published a manifesto alleging a "lack of neutrality and ... obvious political bias in [the Spanish] Wikipedia" and claimed that the Spanish Wikipedia is "edited by people who, hiding behind anonymous editor accounts, take the opportunity to carry out political activism, either by including data erroneous or false, or selecting news from the media with a clear political and ideological bias, which refer to controversial, distorted, insidious or inaccurate information". The manifesto was signed by Juan Carlos Girauta, Álvaro Vargas Llosa, Cayetana Álvarez de Toledo, Joaquín Leguina, Albert Rivera, Daniel Lacalle and Toni Cantó among other right-wing personalities.

The Spanish Wikipedia has been criticized for offering a whitewashed coverage of Cristina Kirchner.

English Wikipedia
In February 2023, Jan Grabowski and Shira Klein published a research article in the Journal of Holocaust Research accusing a number of English Wikipedia editors of engaging in a campaign to "[promote] a skewed version of history on Wikipedia," claiming that their actions "[whitewash] the role of Polish society in the Holocaust and [bolster] stereotypes about Jews." The English Wikipedia's Arbitration Committee subsequently opened a case to investigate and evaluate the actions of editors in the affected articles.

See also 
 Geographical bias on Wikipedia
 Reliability of Wikipedia
 Criticism of Wikipedia

References

Further reading 
 

Criticism of Wikipedia
Media bias controversies